WCNW (1560 kHz) is an AM radio station broadcasting a Christian radio format, combining instructional religious shows with Southern Gospel music. Licensed to Fairfield, Ohio, it serves the Cincinnati metropolitan area.  The station is owned by Vernon R. Baldwin, Inc.

By day, WCNW transmits with 5,000 watts, but 1560 AM is a clear channel frequency, so to protect other stations on the frequency, WCNW is a daytimer and must sign off at night.  During critical hours, it transmits with 1,000 watts.

History
On February 14, 1964, WCNW first signed on the air.  WCNW's call sign originally meant We're Country N Western when the station began broadcasting a country music format.  There was previously a WCNW-FM on 94.9 MHz, which signed on in 1962.  It has since been sold and is now known as WREW.

External links

CNW
Fairfield, Ohio
CNW